Panther Hollow Bridge is a steel three-hinged deck arch bridge carrying Panther Hollow Road over Panther Hollow in Schenley Park in Pittsburgh, Pennsylvania.

It was constructed in 1895–96, roughly contemporaneously with the nearby Schenley Bridge. These nearly identical bridges often confuse even the locals, but Panther Hollow Bridge may be easily distinguished by its monumental bronze sculptures by Giuseppe Moretti of four panthers, crouching as sentinels, on each bridge corner. The bridge also lacks the chain link fencing which is installed on the Schenley Bridge.

Panther Hollow Lake, a recreation spot, lies just west of the bridge.

History
The Panther Hollow Bridge was one of the many Schenley Park improvements completed during the tenure of Pittsburgh Director of Public Works Edward Manning Bigelow. Construction began in August 1895 and the bridge was opened to vehicular traffic in November 1896. The four bronze panthers were added in 1897. They were sculpted by Giuseppe Moretti and cast by the Gorham Manufacturing Company in Providence, Rhode Island. Two of the panthers were dedicated on the Fourth of July in 1897 as the other two were not delivered in time for the ceremony.

See also
List of bridges documented by the Historic American Engineering Record in Pennsylvania

Notes

References

External links

Panther Hollow Bridge (1897) at pghbridges.com

Schenley Park website

Bridges in Pittsburgh
Bridges completed in 1897
Parks in Pittsburgh
City of Pittsburgh historic designations
Pittsburgh History & Landmarks Foundation Historic Landmarks
Road bridges in Pennsylvania
Historic American Engineering Record in Pennsylvania
Schenley Park
Truss arch bridges in the United States
Metal bridges in the United States